"She's a Natural" is a song co-written and recorded by American country music artist Rob Crosby.  It was released in March 1991 as the second single from the album Solid Ground.  The song reached number 15 on the Billboard Hot Country Singles & Tracks chart.  The song was written by Crosby and Rick Bowles.

Cover versions
Don Williams covered the song on his 2012 album And So It Goes.

Chart performance

Year-end charts

References

1991 singles
1990 songs
Rob Crosby songs
Don Williams songs
Songs written by Rob Crosby
Song recordings produced by Scott Hendricks
Arista Nashville singles
Songs written by Rick Bowles